Line 18 of the Shenzhen Metro is an express line under planning, which will connect across Shenzhen for 69.1 kilometers and 29 stations through the districts of Bao'an, Guangming, Guanlan, Pinghu, Longgang and Yantian. Construction is planned to begin in 2023. The first phase of Line 18 has entered Phase V planning, and will run from Shajing in Bao'an District to Baihua in Guangming District, with 8 stations and 18.7 kilometers of track. The line is proposed to use 6 car type A trains.

Stations (Phase 1)

References

Shenzhen Metro lines
Transport infrastructure under construction in China